Maghdan or Moghdan may refer to:
 Moghdan, Bushehr
 Maghdan, Bastak, Hormozgan Province
 Moghdan, Parsian, Hormozgan Province